Arra-Maïda was an Aboriginal Tasmanian woman who was encountered by members of the French expedition to Australia led by Nicolas Baudin in January 1802 on the shores of Bruny Island.

Arra-Maida, accompanied by a group of women, allowed the French scientists Jérôme Bellefin, François Heirisson and François Péron to make anthropologic observations. Her existence is known through the painting made by Peron, which was published in 1807 in his Voyage de découvertes aux terres australes (A Voyage of Discovery to the Southern Hemisphere, performed by Order of the Emperor Napoleon, During the Years 1801, 1802, 1803, and 1804) together with reports of her behaviour.

References

Further reading

External links 

 The Artwork of the Baudin expedition to Australia (1800-1804): Nicolas-Martin Petit's 1802 portrait of an Aboriginal woman and child from Van Diemen's Land

Bruny Island
History of Tasmania
Indigenous Tasmanian people